Dipterocarpus oblongifolius grows as a tree up to  tall, with a trunk diameter of up to . Bark is greyish brown. The specific epithet oblongifolius is from the Latin meaning "oblong leaves". Habitat is river banks from sea-level to  altitude. D. oblongifolius is found in Thailand, Peninsular Malaysia and Borneo.

References

oblongifolius
Plants described in 1856
Trees of Thailand
Trees of Peninsular Malaysia
Trees of Borneo